Brockley Hill was a proposed London Underground station in the Brockley Hill area of north London. The planned location is in what is now Edgware Way Grassland close to Edgwarebury Park on the north side of the junction of Edgware Way / Watford Bypass (A41), and Spur Road (A410).

This station was part of a 1930s extension project named the: Northern Heights. Where new extensions were to be made across the Northern Line. This, along with 2 other stations on the same route called Elstree South and Bushey Heath, would have opened. However, due to World War II, the project had to be scrapped by the organisation of the Green Belt.

History

Planning and construction

The station was the first of three planned by London Passenger Transport Board (LPTB) in 1935 to extend the Northern line from Edgware to Bushey Heath. There was debate about the name for the station, with Edgwarebury, Edgebury, Canons, North Edgware and All Souls all being proposed.

The extension was part of the Northern Heights project which was intended to electrify a number of steam-operated London and North Eastern Railway (LNER) branch lines and to incorporate them into the Northern line. Much of the land for the extension came from the purchase in 1922 by the LPTB's precursor, the Underground Electric Railways Company of London, of the unbuilt Watford and Edgware Railway (W&ER). The W&ER had planned an extension of the Edgware, Highgate and London Railway to Watford Junction via Bushey, but it had never raised the capital required and its powers to construct a line had expired in 1911. The specific route to Bushey Heath was approved by parliament in October 1937. The LPTB's principal purpose for the extension to Elstree was to stimulate the development of new residential areas to increase passenger numbers. A secondary purpose was to provide a location suitable for a large new depot that was required to accommodate and maintain the new fleet of 1938 Stock trains to be used across the existing Northern line and the lines taken over from the LNER.

Brockley Hill station was to be located on a viaduct to the north of the existing junction of Edgware Way and Spur Road. The T-junction was to be reconstructed as a roundabout to incorporate a forecourt for access to a curving range of shops and a continuation of Spur Road heading to the north-east to a new housing development. The station was designed by the LPTB's architectural department in conjunction with the estates department of All Souls College. The station platforms were to be on the viaduct and on a bridge over Spur Road and were to be long enough for nine-car trains being planned for the new Northern line service. The ticket hall was to be located under the bridge with stairs up to the platforms and provision for escalators to be installed later. The station was to be provided with a car park for 20–25 cars.

Construction on the Northern Heights project began in the late 1930s but was interrupted by the Second World War. Most of the work to that date had been carried out on LNER branch tracks, but work between Edgware and Bushey Heath had started in June 1939. The route of the line had been cleared and laid out and some earthworks and tunnelling carried out between Edgware and Elstree South. At the site of Brockley Hill station and south of Edgware Way, construction of the piers of the viaduct had begun and three out of 12 arches at Brockley Hill station had been completed by August 1939. Following the outbreak of war in Europe, work on the station and the extension was suspended in September 1939 and was formally terminated in December of the same year as wartime funding restrictions would prevent completion. During the war years, the LPTB-owned land was used for farming vegetables for staff canteens.

Cancellation

The sites of the new stations were semi-rural and, as elsewhere, it was intended that the new section would stimulate the construction of housing estates that the stations would serve. After the war, new legislation limited expansion of urban areas into the countryside. This created the Metropolitan Green Belt around London and the area covered the Northern line extension. Without housing estates, the line had no purpose and the plans for the route north of Brockley Hill were cancelled in October 1950. 

Some consideration was given to completing the extension as far as Brockley Hill, as it had some housing and the site lay just within the green belt. The line beyond to Bushey Heath would have been completed for access to the depot. Analysis showed the capacity needed without the Bushey extension could be accommodated by developing LNER's former Highgate depot, and the final part of the route was abandoned on 26 November 1953.

The viaduct piers south of Edgware Way were demolished in 1959 to make way for new housing. The completed arches of the station viaduct were partially demolished in the 1960s leaving stumps of brickwork in a field and part of the north abutment of the bridge adjacent to Edgware Way. Earthworks north of the station site parallel with the bypass indicate the route towards Elstree South.

Route between Edgware and Brockley Hill

The route for the railway north from Edgware station had been reserved through the W&ER's right of way before Edgware station was built. As Edgware developed as a suburb of London following the opening of the Underground station in 1924, the route was left clear of housing.

The line was to pass under Station Road and Rectory Lane. It would have then run in a cutting north-west, before cutting Purcells Avenue in two, where a footbridge was to be provided to connect the severed ends. North of Purcells Avenue the tracks continued north-west, rising on to a viaduct to cross over Edgware Way on a bridge to meet the viaduct at the southern end of Brockley Hill station. Following the abandonment of the extension, the unused land between Edgware and Brockley Hill was developed for housing with the western end of Heronsgate, Campbell Croft, Shelley Close and the southern section of Sterling Avenue filling the space.

Notes and references

Notes

References

Bibliography

External links
 Abandoned Tube Stations - Northern Heights: Edgware - Bushey Heath

Proposed London Underground stations
Unbuilt Northern Heights extension stations